Assara cataxutha is a species of snout moth in the genus Assara. It was described by Alfred Jefferis Turner in 1947 and is found in Australia.

References

Moths described in 1947
Phycitini
Moths of Australia